Carolin Nytra (born 26 February 1985 in Hamburg), also known as Carolin Dietrich, is a German athlete who specialises in the 100 metres hurdles. With a personal best time of 12.57 seconds, she became the seventh fastest German ever over this distance at the Diamond League meet in Lausanne on 8 July 2010.

Career 
Nytra represented Germany at the 2008 Summer Olympics and the 2009 World Championships in Athletics, at both events being eliminated at the semi-final stage. However, she did win a silver medal at the 2010 European Team Championships in Bergen, Norway, with a time of 12.81 seconds. She subsequently came first in the 2011 European Athletics Indoor Championships in Paris.

Nytra won the German Athletics Championships for four consecutive years, from 2007 until 2010, and then again in 2012.  In 2012, she again competed in the Olympics.

Her partner is the 2009 European Athletics Indoor Champion Sebastian Bayer.

References

External links 

  
 
 
 
 
 

1985 births
Living people
Athletes from Hamburg
German female hurdlers
German national athletics champions
Olympic athletes of Germany
Athletes (track and field) at the 2008 Summer Olympics
Athletes (track and field) at the 2012 Summer Olympics
European Athletics Championships medalists
21st-century German women